Kaimook Chuto (April 18, 1938 – 1995) was the first female Thai sculptor. She was royal sculptor for Queen Sirikit, and created the Three Kings Monument in Chiang Mai. In April 2017 Google displayed a Google Doodle in her honor.

Notable works 

Other decorative works include the reliefs displayed at Narai Hotel and Dusit Thani Bangkok.

References 

1938 births
1995 deaths
Kaimook Chuto